Bagdadia claviformis is a moth in the family Gelechiidae. It was described by Kyu-Tek Park in 1993. It is found in the China (Anhui, Gansu, Hainan, Henan, Shaanxi), the Russian Far East, Korea and Japan.

The wingspan is 10-11.5 mm. The forewings are yellowish white, irrorated with dark brown scales and with a large ovate yellowish white patch near the end of the cell. The hindwings are pale grey.

References

Bagdadia
Moths described in 1993